Lorenzo Fragola (born 26 April 1995) is an Italian singer-songwriter. He rose to fame after winning the eighth season of the Italian talent show X Factor. His winner's single, "The Reason Why", debuted atop the Italian Singles Chart, and was later certified double platinum by the Federation of the Italian Music Industry.
Fragola competed both in the 65th and 66th Sanremo Music Festival, performing the songs "Siamo uguali" and "Infinite volte", and placing tenth and fifth, respectively. Both his debut album 1995, released in Italy on 31 March 2015, and its follow-up, Zero Gravity (2016) debuted atop the Italian Albums Chart.

Biography

1995–2012: Early birds
Lorenzo Fragola was born in Catania, Sicily, on 26 April 1995. His parents divorced when he was three. Since then, he lived with his mother and brother. 
His interest in music was encouraged by his father, who plays piano. As a child, Fragola started to take music lessons, and he subsequently entered a choir. Despite writing songs since a few years, he refused to sing them to an audience until when he was 17, when he composed and performed a song for a musical based on the film Shakespeare in Love.

After completing high school, Fragola moved to Bologna, where he started studying Arts, Music and Entertainment.

2013–14: X Factor and career breakthrough
In 2013, he auditioned for the seventh series of the Italian talent show X Factor, but he failed to pass the first selection. He tried once again to enter the competition in 2014, when he performed Domenico Modugno's "Cosa sono le nuvole" and his own song "The Reason Why". As a result, he was chosen as one of the contestants of the eighth series of X Factor. Mentioned by Italian rapper Fedez, Fragola reached the final of the competition and, on 11 December 2014, he was announced the winner, beating runner-up Madh.
His prize was a recording contract with Sony Music, with a stated value of €300,000.

During the week preceding the final of X Factor, Fragola's debut single, as well as the new song performed by the remaining semi-finalists, was released to Italian radio stations and as a digital download. Titled "The Reason Why", the song immediately achieved commercial success, reaching the top position of the Italian chart during its first week. The single was also certified double-platinum by the Federation of the Italian Music Industry, denoting sales in excess of 60,000 units.
The song was later included in his self-titled EP, released by Sony Music on 12 December 2014. In December of the same year, Fragola appeared in the music video for the song "Sayonara", released by X Factor runner-up Madh.
Shortly after, Fragola signed a deal with Newtopia, the recording company co-founded by his former X Factor mentor, Fedez. According to the deal, Fragola is now co-managed by Newtopia and Sony Music.

2015: Sanremo Music Festival and debut album
In February 2015, Fragola competed in the "Big Artists" section of the 65th Sanremo Music Festival, performing the song "Siamo uguali", co-written with Fedez and Fausto Cogliati. During the contest, Fragola also performed a cover of Ron's "Una città per cantare", which is an Italian adaptation of "The road", originally recorded by Jackson Browne.
After reaching the final, he finished in tenth place.

Fragola's debut album, 1995, was released on 31 March 2015. 
The album, composed of both Italian-language and English-language songs, includes both his previous singles, "The Reason Why" and "Siamo uguali", as well as tracks co-written by Nek, Rebecca Ferguson and Tom Odell, among the others. 1995 debuted at number one on the Italian Albums Chart. It also spawned the singles "The Rest", released in April 2015, and "#fuori c'è il sole", which became a top-ten hit in Italy during the summer of 2015. On 29 June 2015, Fragola performed a show at the PalaLottomatica in Rome, titled Fragola al cinema and broadcast live in 180 Italian theatres. The show, including Francesca Michielin, Rocco Hunt, Chiara and Nek as musical guests, was a preview of 1995 il Tour, Fragola's first Italian concert tour, which debuted in Autumn of the same year.

2016: Zero Gravity
In February 2016, Fragola competed for the second year in a row in the Sanremo Music Festival. He performed the song "Infinite volte", which reached the fifth position in the Big Artists section. The song preceded Fragola's second studio album, Zero Gravity, which was released on 11 March 2016. The album became his second number-one on the Italian Albums Chart. It also spawned the singles "Luce che entra" and "D'improvviso", certified gold and platinum in Italy, respectively.
On 21 May 2016, Fragola performed the Italian national anthem during the 68th Coppa Italia Final at the Stadio Olimpico in Rome.

Personal life
In 2014, when he was selected as one of the contestants of the eighth series of X Factor, Fragola was engaged with his girlfriend, Federica Consiglio. During an interview released to the Italian edition of Vanity Fair, Fragola stated he considered himself "as if he was married to her", since the couple started living together immediately after completing high school, splitting their time between Bologna, where he was studying Arts, Music and Entertainment, and Modena, where she studies Biotechnology. However, in late December 2014, Consiglio announced through a Facebook post the couple had split on 17 December of the same year.

Discography

Studio albums

EPs

Singles

As lead artist

As featured artist

Other charted songs

Album appearances

Music videos

Sanremo Music Festival entries

Awards and nominations

References

External links
 Lorenzo Fragola at Allmusic
 

1995 births
21st-century Italian  male singers
Italian pop singers
Living people
The X Factor winners
X Factor (Italian TV series) contestants
Musicians from Catania
English-language singers from Italy